Thala ruggeriae is a species of sea snail, a marine gastropod mollusk, in the family Costellariidae, the ribbed miters.

Description
The length of the shell attains 9 mm.

Distribution
This marine species occurs off Zanzibar. This species was formerly identified as Thala Exilis by W. O. Cernohorsky in 1978, but several variations between the two were found after since then.

References

Costellariidae